The Kebbi Emirate, also known as the Argungu Emirate is a traditional state based on the town of Argungu in Kebbi State, Nigeria. It is the successor to the ancient Hausa kingdom of Kebbi.
The Emirate is one of four in Kebbi State, the others being the Gwandu Emirate, Yauri Emirate and Zuru Emirate.

Location

The Kebbi emirate is in the northwest of the modern Kebbi State. In earlier times it extended to the south of its original capital of Birnin Kebbi, which is now capital of the Gwandu Emirate and of Kebbi State itself. The landscape is mainly Sudanian Savanna, open woodland with scattered trees. It is intersected by the lowlands of the Rima River, which are seasonally flooded.
There is a wet season between May and September, with little rain in the remainder of the year. Mean annual rainfall is about 800mm. Average temperatures are about 26 °C, ranging from 21 °C in winter to 40 °C between April and June.
Kebbi is populated by the Kebbawa, a subgroup of the Hausa.

History

Origins

Kebbi is traditionally considered to belong to the Banza bakwai states of Hausaland. According to the locally known Hausa legend, the Kebbi kingdom was one of the Banza Bakwai ("seven bastards") or seven "illegitimate" states. The rulers of these states were supposed to trace their lineage to a concubine of the Hausa founding father, Bayajidda, hence the locally disdainful term banza ("illegitimate").

The first historical references date to the time when the area came under Songhay rule during the reign of Sunni Ali (1464–1492). Kanta Kotal, a Hausa immigrant from Kuyambana in southern Katsina became de facto military governor of the Songhay sub-province of Kebbi, and declared his independence in 1516. During this period Surame, of which the massive walls still survive, was the capital of the kingdom.

Kebbi became a major power in the region, resisting Songhay attacks, expanding into the Yauri and Nupe lands to the south and defeating attempts by the Bornu Empire to invade and occupy the Hausa states.
However, after Kanta's death in 1556 the Hausa states stopped paying tribute, and his son and successor Ahmadu did not attempt to force the issue. By the end of the sixteenth century Kebbi had become a minor kingdom.

Struggle against the Fulani Jihadists

During the Fulani jihad, in 1808 Abdullahi dan Fodio (c. 1766–1828), the younger brother of Shaihu Usman dan Fodio, defeated the forces of Kebbi. He became ruler of the Gwandu Emirate, which dominated the northeast of the Sokoto Caliphate.
The Sarkin Kebbi, Muhammadu Hodi, was driven from his capital and replaced by a puppet ruler, Usuman Masa.
However, the Kebbawa continued to resist, and Abdullahi was unable to complete the conquest.
Muhammadu Hodi fought on in the Zamfara Valley, and his successor Karari in Argungu and Zazzagawa.
On Karari's death in 1831, his son Yakubu Nabame surrendered, and for 16 years lived in exile in Sokoto until Sultan Aliyu Babba allowed him to return to Argungu as a vassal of the Caliphate.

In 1849 Yakubu renounced his allegiance and proclaimed himself Sarkin Kebbi. After see-saw battles, including at one time a siege of Argungu by Sokoto forces, Sultan Aliyu of Sokoto effectively recognized the independence of the Kebbi Emirate based in Argungu. However the Sokoto government effectively controlled Kebbi politics and it acted as a puppet state. Kebbi now formed a hostile wedge between Sokoto and Gwandu, and sporadic warfare continued for the next fifty years.
In 1859 Yakubu's brother and successor Yusufu Mainasara was killed in battle in the dried out floodplain of the Rima River.
In 1860 the Emir of Gwandu, Haliru, was killed in battle at Karakara. In 1867 the Fulani recognized the independence of Kebbi in a formal treaty. In 1875 war broke out again when the people of Fanna in the lower Rima valley decided to transfer their allegiance to Gwandu. Sarkin Kebbi Sama'ila achieved a string of successes against Gwandu between 1883 and 1903, with some severe setbacks, until the establishment of the British protectorate of Northern Nigeria finally ended the fighting.

Colonial occupation

On 5 August 1890 the British and French concluded an agreement to divide West Africa between the two colonial powers. Under this agreement, Britain would acquire all territories up to and including the Sokoto Caliphate, while the French would take the lands further to the north. The people of the region were not consulted. The Frenchman Parfait-Louis Monteil was given charge of an expedition to discover the northern limits of the Sokoto caliphate. Reaching Argungu in the summer of 1891, he found that the emirate was independent of Sokoto, although it was to be defeated by Sokoto in March 1892 and forced to once again become a subject state.
Monteil also found little evidence of the presence claimed in the region by the British Royal Niger Company, apart from a few commercial depots in Gwandu.

When the British heard of Monteil's report, and then heard that the French had raised their flag in Argungu, they dispatched troops to Argungu in 1898, where they found no French presence.
The British established a permanent force in Argungu in 1902 to provide protection to French caravans crossing the British zone by agreement, and then to protect the boundary commission that was delimiting the boundary between the French and British spheres. On hearing word that the Sultan of Sokoto was gathering his forces, this force and others were dispatched to Sokoto where after some fighting they achieved a decisive victory.
Sarkin Sama had welcomed the British for political reasons, since under the British system of indirect rule he was able to regain and consolidate his power.

By 1908, British power was unquestioned. At a durbar held in 1908 for the colonial governor Frederick Lugard, the emirs of Kebbi and Gwandu and the Sultan of Sokoto turned out in force, with a show of fifteen thousand horsemen and camels. The Emirs gave Lugard sixteen ponies as tribute, and prostrated themselves before him.
The British established a system where the emirs were given large administrative authority subject to the direction of District Officers. The Argungu posting was not sought after. The mosquitoes were so bad that the D.O. had to sleep in a specially constructed mosquito cage.

Emirate today

Fishing festival
The annual Argungu Fishing Festival is one of the largest cultural events in northern Nigeria.
The Festival has a long history.
It was first staged when the Sultan of Sokoto, Hassan Dan Mu’azu, visited the Argungu Emirate in 1934, and was held to display the fishing ability of the Kabawas by the Emir Muhammed Sama.
Until the 1960s the festival was a local affair, but in 1972 it was attended by the Nigerian Head of State, General Yakubu Gowon and his counterpart from Niger, Hamani Diori. For political reasons, the festival lost support and no festival was staged from 1999 until 2004. The festival has now been revived and is becoming a major tourist attraction.

By 2009, the renamed Argungu International and Cultural Festival included a grand durbar with 500 well-decorated horses and their riders, and 120 well decorated camels and their riders, led by the flag bearer of the Argungu Emirate and including participants from many other ethnic groups.
The largest fish weighed 55 kg, and the prizes for this catch were presented at a ceremony attended by President Umaru Musa Yar'Adua, his wife, six governors and many traditional rulers.
The 2009 festival also included water sports, archery and catapulting competitions, a motor rally, performances by dance troupes from Niger, Mali, Chad and Benin, wrestling and boxing matches, and an agricultural fair.
The importance of the festival to the economy has led the government to conserve fish stock by prohibiting use of gill nets and cast nets.

Irrigation plan
The Zauro polder project was conceived in 1969 and long delayed, but seemed likely to be started in 2009.
The project would irrigate 10,572 hectares of farmland in the floodplain of the Rima River between Argungu and Birnin Kebbi.
Crops would include rice, maize, wheat, barley and vegetables such as cow peas, onions, tomatoes, sweet potatoes and Irish potatoes.
The dam would also benefit the fishing industry, important in the state.
The project promises significant benefits but is controversial, since it would change land use patterns, displace some communities and flood the site of the annual fishing festival. The Emir of Argungu has been stoned in protests over the project.

Museum

In June 2009 Argungu Emirate presented a proposal to the National Commission for Museums and Monuments to give the historic Surame site a World Heritage listing.
Surame was the first capital of the Kebbi Kingdom, founded by Mohammadu Kanta Kotal.
Senator Umaru Abubakar Argungu also asked for help make the Kanta Museum not only a national monument but a historical cultural resource for the World Heritage List.
The museum building, adjacent to the main market was built in 1831 by Yakubu Nabame and served as the Emir's palace until 1942, when the British built a new administrative palace during the reign of Muhammed Sani.  On 1 July 1958, it opened as a museum, offering an insight into the turbulent history of Kebbi State. The museum has a notable collection of weapons, consisting of charms, spears, swords, wood, stones, bows and arrows, local guns and even drums on display. The museum is also known to be a place where dead emirs of the local government are buried.

Rulers
Rulers of the Hausa kingdom before incorporation into the Sokoto Caliphate:

Rulers of the Hausa Emirate established at Argungu:

Bibliography 

 Harris, P. G.: Sokoto Provincial Gazetteer, Sokoto 1938 [Cyclostyled].
 Hogben, S. J. and A. H. M. Kirk-Greene: The Emirates of Northern Nigeria, London 1966.
 Johnston, H. A. S., The Fulani Empire of Sokoto, Oxford 1967 (pp. 187–195).

References

History of Nigeria
Nigerian traditional states
Emirates